Zammad is a free helpdesk or issue tracking system. It offers the connection of various channels like email, chat, telephone, Twitter, or Facebook. Zammad is developed in the programming languages Ruby and JavaScript. The name Zammad comes from the Bavarian language and means "together".

General 

Zammad was founded by Martin Edenhofer, who was formerly involved in the development of OTRS.

The project asks for active participation in the development. The source code is free software according to the AGPL-3.0-only license and available via git. For this purpose, the Zammad Foundation was founded to ensure the freedom of the software. Inspiration for the Zammad Foundation are the WordPress Foundation, the Free Software Foundation, and the Mozilla Foundation.

User Interface 

The user interface is modern and attractive. It has been redesigned from scratch and can be used by occasional users without training without any problems. Technologically, the user interface is implemented as a web application with CSS, JavaScript, and HTML5 (including WebSockets), which means that the application runs in the browser – only data is exchanged over the network (in REST). Thus the WebApp feels like a native application and is capable of real-time (information is updated in all clients immediately after creation/change without reloading the application/web page). The design of the interface was developed with Zeughaus Design GmbH.

In version 3.0 Zammad was extended by a knowledge base.

Backend 

The backend is realized in Ruby on Rails and communicates with the user interface via REST. Zammad relies on Elasticsearch to speed up search queries.

MySQL, MariaDB, or PostgreSQL are supported as database servers. Nginx or Apache can be used as a web server or reverse proxy.

Version history 

The planned release cycle was 4 weeks, on the 14th of the month.

Awards 

 Bronze OSBAR (Open Source Business Award 2016), on 7 December 2016, awarded by the Open Source Business Alliance
 1st place in the Thomas Krenn Award 2017, on 12 March 2017
 DINACon Award in Category 1: Best Open Source Project, on 18 October 2019, which means that Zammad was also nominated for the Digital Economy Award

References

External links 

 Official Website
 Zammad Foundation
 Zammad Community
 

Customer relationship management
Free email software
Ruby (programming language)